The Sierra Vista Public Transit System is the public transportation agency that serves the Cochise County, Arizona. Routes run every 30 minutes on weekdays. Five of the six routes meet at a downtown transit center.

Route list
Blue Central 
Green Eastside 
Orange Westside
Red West & Central (Saturday only)
Brown Fort Huachuca (Saturday only)

External links
 

Transportation in Cochise County, Arizona
Bus transportation in Arizona
Transit agencies in Arizona
Sierra Vista, Arizona